Cheech & Chong: Roasted is a 2008 roast of comedians Cheech & Chong broadcast on TBS.

The roast
On November 30, 2008, Cheech & Chong were honored during a roast special on TBS hosted by Brad Garrett which included other guests, among them Chong's wife. The event was filmed at Caesar's Palace in Las Vegas during The Comedy Festival.

Guests
Brad Garrett hosted the event. Guests included Tom Arnold, Shelby Chong, Whitney Cummings, Andy Dick, Greg Giraldo, Penn Jillette, Ralphie May, Geraldo Rivera, Teller, and Wilmer Valderrama.

References

External links
 

2008 television specials
2008 comedy films
2008 films
American comedy films
2000s American television specials
Roast (comedy)
Caesars Palace
Films directed by John Moffitt